Sohan Lal Dhusiya (1923-2005) was an Indian politician. He was a Member of Parliament, representing Uttar Pradesh in the Rajya Sabha the upper house of India's Parliament as a member of the Indian National Congress.

References

External links
 Official biographical sketch in Parliament of India website

Rajya Sabha members from Uttar Pradesh
Lok Sabha members from Uttar Pradesh
India MPs 1952–1957
Indian National Congress politicians
1923 births
2005 deaths
Indian politicians
Indian National Congress politicians from Uttar Pradesh